Santiago Tepetlapa is a town and municipality in Oaxaca, in southwestern Mexico. The municipality has an area of 13.624 km² and is part of the Coixtlahuaca district in the Mixteca Region.

As of the 2010 census, the town (locality) had a population of 101 inhabitants, while the municipality had a total population of 131 inhabitants. It is the second-smallest municipality in Mexico in population, larger than only Santa Magdalena Jicotlán, also in Oaxaca.

References

Municipalities of Oaxaca